Kogoya is surname.

List of people with the surname 

 Egianus Kogoya (born 1999), commander in the Free Papua Movement
 Frengky Kogoya (born 1997), Indonesian professional footballer

Surnames of Oceanian origin